Kepka is a surname. Notable people with the surname include:

J. P. Kepka (born 1984), American short track speed skater
Ondřej Kepka (born 1969), Czech actor, film director, screenwriter, presenter, and photographer

See also
Koepka